Padre Davide Maria da Bergamo, born Felice Moretti (Zanica, 21 January 1791 – Piacenza, 24 July 1863), was an Italian monk, famed for his skills as an organist and composer.

Selected discography
 Padre Davide da Bergamo Vol.I – Musica per la Liturgia – Organist Marco Ruggeri. Tactus Records TC.792901 (2003)
 Padre Davide da Bergamo Vol.II – Il Repertorio da Concerto – Organist Marco Ruggeri. Tactus Records TC.792902 (2003)

Media

References

External links
 

1791 births
1863 deaths
Italian classical composers
Italian male classical composers
Italian classical organists
Male classical organists
19th-century Italian male musicians
19th-century Italian Roman Catholic priests
19th-century organists